Julian Jackson (born September 12, 1960) is a former professional boxer from the U.S. Virgin Islands who competed from 1981 to 1998. He is a three-time world champion in two weight classes, having held the WBA super welterweight title from 1987 to 1990, and the WBC middleweight title twice between 1990 and 1995. Possessing formidable knockout power, Jackson is regarded by many as one of the hardest punchers in boxing history, pound for pound, and was ranked number 25 by The Ring magazine in a 2003 list of "100 Greatest Punchers". Jackson's knockout-to-win ratio stands at 89%. Jackson was elected to the International Boxing Hall of Fame in 2019.

Amateur career
Jackson represented the United States Virgin Islands at the 1979 Pan American Games, losing his first fight to Jose Baret of the Dominican Republic.

Jackson reportedly completed his amateur career with a record of 15 wins, 2 losses.

Professional career
Jackson turned professional in February 1981 and had many of his early fights in Puerto Rico, where he lived for a short time, and gained a shot at WBA super welterweight champion Mike McCallum in August 1986.  Jackson hurt the champion on a couple occasions in the first round, but McCallum came storming back with a barrage that forced the referee to stop matters in the second round.

After McCallum moved up to middleweight, Jackson got his second shot at the now-vacant WBA title in November 1987 against Korean Baek In-chul, winning in three rounds. Baek would go on to win the WBA super-middleweight title a year later. Jackson made three defenses of his crown, against former IBF title-holder Buster Drayton (TKO 3), Francisco DeJesus (KO 8), and future three-time  champion Terry Norris (TKO 2). All these defenses were won with a single knockout punch.

Jackson then vacated his crown, moved up to 160 lb (73 kg), and was matched against Herol 'Bomber' Graham for the vacant WBC middleweight title. Due to Jackson's recent retina damage which had required surgery, the British Boxing Board of Control felt that Jackson was returning to boxing too soon and didn't allow him to box in the UK, so the bout was held at Torrequebrada Hotel & Casino, Benalmádena, Andalucía, Spain on 24 November 1990.

Graham was putting on his typical savvy performance against Jackson: countering, slipping, and dancing out of the way, targeting Jackson's vulnerable eye which started to swell. After being consistently beaten to the punch for three and a half rounds, Jackson then unleashed one of the great right hands in boxing history. After Jackson connected with the punch, Graham was unconscious before he hit the canvas, and was revived only after five alarming minutes.

Defenses against Dennis Milton (KO 1), Ismael Negron (KO 1), and Ron Collins (TKO 5) ended quickly, but Thomas Tate would make Jackson work longer and harder in their August 1992 encounter – Julian had to go to the scorecards for the first time in a title bout in winning a 12-round unanimous decision, scoring a knockdown along the way. At this point Jackson was in the middle of the pound-for-pound rankings.

This would lead to his showdown in May 1993 with another big hitter, Gerald McClellan. This time the challenger prevailed, as Jackson failed to find the knockout blow when hitting McClellan with hard punches and controlling Rounds 2 and 3, with McClellan turning the fight around and knocking Jackson down twice in the fifth round. The second knockdown prompted the referee to stop the fight, after Jackson made it to his feet yet remained unsteady. After winning his next three fights, Jackson had another shot at the title in May 1994 in a rematch with McClellan. In a very brief fight, Jackson hit McClellan with some hard punches, but Jackson was then hurt himself and put under heavy pressure by McClellan, with McClellan flooring Jackson with a left hook to the body after 65 seconds. The referee counted Jackson out as he rose to his feet.
  
After McClellan vacated the title to move up to super-middleweight, Jackson would have a second but brief reign as WBC middleweight champion, beating the previously undefeated European champion Agostino Cardamone in March 1995. Jackson had a shaky end to the first round, during which he was hurt and put under pressure until the bell by Cardamone, who wasn't considered a hard puncher. In round two however, Jackson again showed his punching power by suddenly dropping Cardamone heavily with a short right hand. Cardamone managed to make it to his feet but remained badly shaken, forcing the referee to stop the fight.

Jackson lost the title in his first defense against Quincy Taylor in August 1995, by a sixth round stoppage. During the fight with Taylor, Jackson tore his rotator cuff and looked a shadow of his former self. Jackson would have four more low-key victories, before ending his career with losses to Verno Phillips and Anthony Jones, both in nine rounds, in 1998.

Life after boxing
After retiring from the sport, Jackson joined the ministry and still lives in his birthplace of St. Thomas, Virgin Islands. He has continued his involvement in the local boxing field as a trainer and coach, and his three sons, Julius Jackson, Julian Jackson Jr. and John Jackson, have all competed professionally since 2009.

Jackson was once hired by Coral World Ocean Park in St. Thomas as a way to attract visitors to the park.

Professional boxing record

References

External links

Q&A: Julian Jackson!

1960 births
Living people
World boxing champions
United States Virgin Islands male boxers
People from Saint Thomas, U.S. Virgin Islands
American male boxers
World Boxing Association champions
World Boxing Council champions
World middleweight boxing champions
World light-middleweight boxing champions
Boxers at the 1979 Pan American Games
Pan American Games competitors for the United States Virgin Islands
International Boxing Hall of Fame inductees